Zubo is a rhythm action video game developed by EA Bright Light for the Nintendo DS. The game was released in October 2008 on Europe and Australia, January 2009 in Japan and March 2009 in North America.

Plot
Zubo is set in the world of Zubalon, which is inhabited by a race called the Zubos. Zubalon is under siege by Big Head and his army of fake Zubo clones, named Zombos.

The objective of the game is to go on a journey around Zubalon with a team of any 3 Zubos you meet along your way, to scavenger through 3 different worlds, defeat all bosses, and then defeat the final boss, Big Head at the end of the game to save and restore the world of Zubalon.

Bosses

"Tech Head", the 3rd boss out of 4 total bosses in the game. Tech Head is the boss of "Super Island", which is the 3rd world of the game. He makes his first appearance on Super Island once you reach that area in the game.

Tech Head's debut appearance in the game. He appears when you enter Super Island. He's a threat to the player and challenges the player to a battle.

The final physical form of Tech Head. After you defeat him in his tower an (x) number of times (3 times), he transitions into this physical form for the last battle between him and the player.

The final and overall boss of the game, "Big Head". Boss of Sleepy Head, Icy Head, and Tech Head. He's in charge of placing and controlling all the Zombos, planting his evil roots, and wreaking havoc on Zubalon.

Gameplay

All actions, including movement, selection, and battles, are performed with the stylus and touch screen. In Zubo, players can befriend up to 55 different types of Zubos they meet while travelling in Zubalon, feed and nurture them, help them gain skills and strength, and assist them in chasing off Zombos. Each Zubo is one of 3 types which allows a fully flexible team that you can use to your own advantage in strategic battles with rhythm action mechanics, where the player attacks by tapping or sliding the stylus on the Nintendo DS's touchscreen; different Zubo types are stronger or weaker at attacking others. The game is divided into several themed worlds, each with a team of Zubos which the player can add to their team.

Reception

Zubo received mixed reviews. Critics complimented its charming presentation and new combat system, recommending it for children, while criticizing its lack of storyline and lack of objectives.

References

2008 video games
Action video games
Electronic Arts games
Nintendo DS games
Nintendo DS-only games
Video games developed in the United Kingdom